Erethistes pusillus is a species of South Asian river catfish native to India, Bangladesh and Myanmar where it is mostly found in hill streams. This species prefers muddy portions of rivers that are overgrown with vegetation.  This species grows to a length of  SL. It is kept in tropical aquaria, but its occurrence in the aquarium trade is very rare.

References 
 

Erethistidae
Fish of Asia
Fish of India
Fish of Bangladesh
Taxa named by Johannes Peter Müller
Taxa named by Franz Hermann Troschel
Fish described in 1849